Abbey Park was a football stadium in Grimsby, Lincolnshire, England. It was the home ground of Grimsby Town between 1889 and 1899.

History
Abbey Park was built as a replacement for Grimsby's previous ground, Clee Park. It consisted of a main seated stand on the northern touchline of the pitch and a raised bank on the southern touchline. Behind the eastern end of the pitch there was a 300-seat stand moved from Clee Park, alongside an 800-capacity terrace. The dressing rooms were located in the south-east corner of the ground.

The ground was opened on 30 August 1889 with a friendly match against West Brom, which Grimsby won 6–1. Grimsby became founder members of the Football League Second Division in 1892, and the first League game at Abbey Park on 3 September 1892 saw Grimsby beat Northwich Victoria 2–1 in front of 5,000 spectators.

The record attendance of 10,000 was set on 26 December 1896 for a match against Newcastle United (with Grimsby winning 3–2) and equalled for an 8 April 1897 game against Woolwich Arsenal, a game which Grimsby won 3–1. In 1899 Grimsby moved to Blundell Park; the final match at Abbey Park was played against Darwen on 15 April 1899, with the 9–2 victory also being the ground's record home win.

A housing development was later built on the site.

References

Defunct football venues in England
Sports venues in Lincolnshire
English Football League venues
Grimsby Town F.C.
Sports venues completed in 1889
Buildings and structures in Grimsby
Football Alliance venues